Sri Lanka–Turkey relations are the foreign relations between Sri Lanka and Turkey. Turkey has an embassy in Colombo since 2013. Sri Lanka has an embassy in Ankara since 2012.

History 
The relations between Sri Lanka and Turkey existed before the founding of both modern-day nations. Turkey's first formal relations with Sri Lanka began with the Ottoman Empire's assignment to the honoury consul of Sri Lanka in Galle in 1864 and until 1915, Ottoman honoury consuls served in Sri Lanka.

Diplomatic Relations 
Turkey has historically been supportive of Sri Lanka's commitment to nonalignment. Relations have generally been very friendly — especially with the United National Party governments, such as the J. R. Jayewardene government that gave Sri Lanka's foreign policy a decidedly Western orientation. Prior to that, relations were tense with the Sri Lanka Freedom Party government under Sirimavo Bandaranaike, who deeply mistrusted the West and cultivated relations with China instead.

Then Prime Minister Recep Tayyip Erdoğan visited Sri Lanka after the 2004 Indian Ocean earthquake and tsunami.

Presidential Visits

Economic Relations 
 Trade volume between the two countries was US$185.7 million in 2019 (Turkish exports/imports: 84.3/101.4 million USD).

See also 

 Foreign relations of Sri Lanka
 Foreign relations of Turkey

References

Further reading 
 "At Last, a Farewell to Arms," Asiaweek [Hong Kong], 13, No. August 9, 1987, pp. 10–11, 13.
 "A Very Mixed Up Picture," Frontline [Madras], 3, No. 10. May 1986, pp. 4–10. 
 "Bearing the Blockade," India Today [New Delhi], No. 12, February 15, 1987, pp. 80–83. 
 "Blasting Peace," Asiaweek [Hong Kong], 13, No. 47, November 20, 1987, p. 20.
 "Colombo's New Challenge," Asiaweek [Hong Kong], 12, No. 40, October 5, 1986, p. 23.
 "Conciliation in Colombo," Times [London], May 25, 1985, p. 7. 
 "Continuing Impasse on the Autonomy Issue, Economic Review [Hong Kong], 135, No. 9, February 26, 1987, pp. 36-41.
 "Coping with Containment, Economic Review "Militants and Military Wage Undisciplined War," Far Eastern Economic Review [Hong Kong], 135, No. 9, February 26, 1987, pp. 18–19. 
 "District Development Councils in Sri Lanka, " Asian Survey, 22, No. 11, November 1982, pp. 1117–34. 
 "India Cracks the Whip," Asiaweek [Hong Kong], 12, No. 47, November 23, 1986, p. 33.
 "India Talks Cover Crisis in Sri Lanka," New York Times, June 3, 1985, p. 1.
 "Peace Eludes Devolution, Far Eastern Economic Review [Hong Kong], 138, No. 48, November 26, 1987, pp. 26-27. 
 "President Jayewardene: Half- Term Report," Round Table [London], No. 282, April 1981, pp. 149–62.
 "Pressed to Print," Far Eastern Economic Review [Hong Kong], 138, No. 50, December 10, 1987, p. 104. 
 "Radical Conflict and the Rationalization of Violence in Sri Lanka," Pacific Affairs [Vancouver], 59, No. 1, Spring 1986, pp. 28–44.
 "Sri-Lanka menace par la guerre civile, Le Monde [Paris] April 21, 1984, p. 1.
 "Sri Lanka's War Grows," Washington 1987, Al, A30. 
 "Sri Lanka, India Await Rebel Truce," Washington Post, August 1, 1987, pp. A15, A17.
 "Sri Lanka: A Nation Disintegrates," New Magazine, December 13, 1987, pp. 34–38, 80–81, 85.
 "Sri Lanka: La longue marche vers l'unite," Afrique-Asie [Paris], No. 316, February 27, 1984, pp. 38–39.
 "Sri Lanka: War or Peace?" Frontline [Madras], No. 14, July 12, 1986, pp. 4–16. 
 "Sri Lanka in 1986: A Nation at the Crossroads," Asian Survey, 27, No. 2, February 1987, pp. 155–62.
 "Sri Lankan Lists Reforms to End Ethnic Violence," Washington Post, June 26, 1986, p. A27.
 "Sri Lankans Doubt Military Can End War," Christian Science Monitor, September 22, 1986, p. 9. 
 "Sri Lanka Peace Process at Delicate Point," Christian Science Monitor, September 2, 1986, pp. 11–14.
 "Sri Lanka Refutes Statement of Indian Minister of External Affairs." Statement of Sri Lankan High Commissioner, New Delhi, March 1, 1986.
 "Text of Indo-Sri Lanka Agreement," [Madras], "Time of Troubles and Trial," Frontline [Madras], 3, No. 24 August 8, 1987, pp. 116–17.
 "The Point of No Return," Far Eastern Economic Review [Hong Kong], 125, No. 38, September 20, 1984, pp. 23–27. 
 "The Situation in And How It Came About," Round Table [London], No. 290, April 1984, pp. 188–204. 
 "Tigers in a Corner, Far Eastern Economic Review [Hong Kong], 138, No. 44, October 29, 1987, pp. 36-37.
 "Trouble from the South," Far Eastern Economic Review "Under the Surface Calm," Far Eastern Economic Review 
 "Waging Peace in Sri Lanka," Frontline [Madras], 4, No. 16, August 8, 1987, pp. 4–19, 21–26, 115–19.
 Abraham, A.S. "Gathering Sri Lanka Dangerous Ambivalence," Times of India [Bombay], April 13, 1984,
 Ali, Salamat. "The Price of Power," Far Eastern Economic Review [Hong Kong], 138, No. 48, November 26, 1987, p. 28.
 Ali Khan, Ahsan. "Is Sri Lanka Heading Towards Partition?" Muslim [Islamabad], June 22, 1986, p. 4.
 Balasingham, A.S. Liberation Tigers and Tamil Eelam Freedom Struggle. Madras: Makkal Acchakan, 1983.
 Baxter, Craig, Yogendra K. Malik, Charles H. Kennedy, and Robert C. Oberst. "Sri Lanka." pp. 295–352 in Government and Politics in South Asia. Boulder, Colorado: Westview Press, 1987.
 Bjorkman, James Warner. The Changing Division of Labor in South Asia: Women and Men in India's Society, Economy, and Politics. New Delhi: Manohar, 1987.
 Blackton, John Stuart. Local Government and Rural Development in Sri Lanka. (Special Series on Rural Local Government, No. Ithaca: Cornell University Press, 1974.
 Burger, Angela S. "Policing a Communal Society: The Case Sri Lanka," Asian Survey, 27, No. 7, July 1987, pp. 822–33. 
 Canagaretna, Surjit M. "Nation Building in a Multiethnic Setting: The Sri Lankan Case," Asian Affairs, 14, Spring 1987, pp. 1–19. 
 Chandra Richard. Sri Lanka: A History. New Delhi: Vikas, "Sri Lanka: The Ethnic Crisis," Asian Thought and Society: An International Review, 10, No. 29, July 1985, pp. 137–41. 
 Claude, Patrice. " 'Old Man' Beset by Chaos," Manchester Guardian Weekly [Manchester], May 10, 1987, p. 11.
 Corea, Ernest. Background Note: Conflict. Washington: Embassy of the Democratic Socialist Republic of Sri Lanka, 1983.
 de Silva, K.M. A History of Sri Lanka. Delhi: Oxford University Press, 1981.
 de Silva, Manik. "The Domestic Equation," Far Eastern Economic Review [Hong Kong], 135, No. 9, February 9, 1987, p. 16.
 Jack, Ian. "Sri Lanka's Last Bid to Woo Tamils from Terror," Sunday Times [London], December 16, 1984, p. 21. 
 Jayewardene, Junius R. Address to Parliament by the President on 20 February 1986. Colombo: Government Press, 1986.
 Jenkins, Loren. "Gandhi Brokering Derailed by Tamils," Washington Post, August 30, 1985, pp. A25, A33. 
 Jiggins, Janice. Caste and Family in the Politics of the Sinhalese, 1947–1976. Cambridge: Cambridge University Press, 1979. 
 Jofferand, Marie. "The Political Party System in Sri Lanka," Political Science Quarterly, 98, No. 1, Spring 1983, pp. 17–33.
 Kearney, Robert N. "Sri Lanka in 1985: The Persistence of Conflict," Asian Survey, 27, No. 2, February 1986, pp. 219–23. 
 Kulkarni, V.G. "The Island of Tears," Far Eastern Economic Review [Hong Kong], 122, No. 46, November 17, 1983, pp. 30–36.
 Mahendran, Sharmini. "Sri A Country in Crisis," Harvard International Review, 9, November–December 1986, p. 48. 
 Manor, James (ed.). Sri Lanka in Change and Crisis. New York: St. Martin's Press, 1984.
 Manor, James, and Gerald Segal. "Causes of Conflict: Sri Lanka and Indian Ocean Strategy," Asian Survey, 25, No. 12, December 1985, pp. 1165–85. 
 Matthews, Brace. "Devolution of Power in Sri Lanka," Round Table [London], No. 301, January 1987, pp. 74–91. 
 Ministry of Local Government, Housing, and Construction. Urban Development Authority. Sri Lanka's New Capital, Sri Jayawardanapura. Colombo; 1982. 
 Misquita, Michelle. "Sri Lanka." pp. 311–15 in Asia and Pacific,  1984, Saffron Walden, Essex, United Kingdom: World of Information, 1984.
 Narayan, S. Venkat. "Breakthrough at Last," India Today [New Nyrop, Richard F. (ed.). India: A Country Study. Washington: GPO, 1985.
 Oberst, Robert. Legislators and Representation in Sri Lanka: The Decentralization of Development Planning. (Westview Special Studies on South and Southeast Asia.) Boulder, Colorado: Westview Press, 1985.
 Obeyesekere, Gananath. "Political Violence and the Future of Democracy in Sri Lanka," Internationales Asienforum [Munich], 15, Nos. 1–2, January–February 1984, pp. 39–60. 
 Peebles, Patrick. Democracy and Violence in Sri Lanka. Hanover, New Hampshire: Universities Field Staff International, 1983. 
 Samarasinghe, S.W.R. de A. "Sri Lanka in 1982: A Year of Elections," Asian Survey, 23, No. 2, February 1983, pp. 158–64. 
 Sebastian, Rita. "None Can Win Lanka Civil War," Indian Express [New Delhi], December 27, 1985, p. 8.
 Silver, Eric. "Colombo Peace Moves Collapse," Guardian [Man"Sri Lanka." pp. 1811-31 in George Thomas Kurian (ed.), Encyclopedia of the Third World. (3rd ed.) New York: Facts on File, 1987.
 Sri Lanka, Democratic Socialist Republic of. Ministry of Information. This Is the Truth Sri Lanka. Colombo, 1983. 
 Tambiah, Stanley. Sri Lanka: Ethnic Fratricide and the Dismantling of Democracy. Chicago: University of Chicago Press, 1986. 
 Tasker, Rodney. "Brink of Civil War, Far Eastern Economic Review [Hong Kong], 127, No. 7, February 21, 1985, pp. 36-41.
 Tenorio, Vyvyan. "Rising Racism in Sri Lanka's Ethnic Strife Weakens Fabric of Nation," Christian Science Monitor, November 22, 1985, p. 18. 
 Viswam, S. "India- Sri Lanka Agreement: Triumph of Statesmanship," Indian and Foreign Review [New Delhi], 24, September 30, 1987, pp. 4–30. 
 Weintraub, Richard M. "India, Sri Lanka Await Result of Gamble," Washington Post, August 3, 1987, pp. Al, A18.
 Weisman, Steven R. "A Centuries-Old Struggle Keeps Sri Lanka on Edge," New York Times, February 17, 1985, E2. 
 Wickremasinghe, W.G. "The Cry for Eelam," Daily News [Colombo], February 11, 1983, p. 4.
 Wiswa Warnapala, W.A. Recent Politics in Sri Lanka: Study of Electoral Practice and Behaviour in an Asian Democracy. New Delhi: Navrang, 1983.

Turkey
Bilateral relations of Turkey